John Ngu Foncha (21 June 1916 – 10 April 1999) was a Cameroonian politician, who served as 5th Prime Minister of Cameroon.

Career 
Foncha was born in Bamenda. He founded the Kamerun National Democratic Party (KNDP) in 1955 and became Premier of the British Cameroons on 1 February 1959. He held that position until 1 October 1961, when the region merged into a federation with Francophone Cameroon.

From 1 October 1961 to 13 May 1965, Foncha concurrently served as 5th Prime Minister of Cameroon and Vice-President of the Federal Republic of Cameroon. He held the latter title until 1970.

In 1994, he led a delegation of the Southern Cameroons National Council (SCNC) to the United Nations to request its backing of the movement's drive for greater autonomy in Cameroon's two English-speaking provinces. His grandson is Jean-Christian Foncha.

He died in Bamenda on 10 April 1999 at the age of 82.

Gallery

References

1916 births
1999 deaths
People from Bamenda
Kamerun National Democratic Party politicians
British Cameroon
Prime Ministers of Cameroon
Vice presidents of Cameroon
Southern Cameroons
Kamerun National Congress politicians